A Finance Act is the headline fiscal (budgetary) legislation enacted by the UK Parliament, containing multiple provisions as to taxes, duties, exemptions and reliefs at least once per year, and in particular setting out the principal tax rates for each fiscal year.

Overview
In the UK, the Chancellor of the Exchequer delivers a Budget speech on Budget Day, outlining changes in spending, as well as tax and duty. The changes to tax and duty are passed as law, and each year form the respective Finance Act. Additional Finance Acts are also common and are the result of a change in governing party due to a general election, a pressing loophole or defect in the law of taxation, or a backtrack with regard to government spending or taxation.

The rules governing the various taxation methods are contained within the relevant taxation acts. Capital Gains Tax legislation, for example, is contained within Taxation of Chargeable Gains Act 1992. The Finance Act details amendments to be made to each one of these Acts. The main taxes are Excise Duties, Value Added Tax, Income Tax, Corporation Tax, and Capital Gains Tax.

Excise
Excise duties are inland duties levied on articles at the time of their manufacture.
Alcoholic liquor duties
Alcoholic Liquor Duties Act 1979
Hydrocarbon Oil Duty
Hydrocarbon Oil Duties Act 1979
Tobacco products duty
Tobacco Products Duty Act 1979 
Gaming duty
Finance Act 1997 (rates of gaming duty) 
Amusement Machine Licence Duty
Betting and Gaming Duties Act 1981
Vehicle Excise Duty
Vehicle Excise and Registration Act 1994

Specific finance acts

Finance Act 1910

The Finance (1909–10) Act 1910 resulted in a significant net increase in taxation, and it also requisitioned a survey dubbed by right-wing journalists the "Lloyd George's Domesday land-survey", in particular entailing the 1910–1915 valuation maps.

Each property and related right under and over land (hereditament) in England and Wales was surveyed and valued, so Increment Value Duty based on land value could be levied when any property was sold. The initial rate was 20% of the increase in land-value between the date of the survey and the date of sale (capital gain). This tax was substantively altered by the repeal of s. 67 by the Finance Act 1920 which superseded it.

As part of the survey, landowners had to fill in a form, and the resulting records are extremely useful for local history.

The records today consist of:
 working maps
 valuation maps
 valuation books
 field books.

The valuation maps and books are kept in local record offices, and the other items are in the National Archives at Kew, London (field books in series IR58; working maps in series IR121 to IR135 according to region and each region has up to 22 different districts).

Finance Act 1920
This included a new "Duty on licences for mechanically propelled vehicles" (Vehicle Excise Duty, which went into the Road Fund until 1936), repealed "customs duties on motor spirit and motor spirit dealers licence duties", and introduced "Provisions as to spirits used for generating mechanical power" along with other provisions related to income tax and tax on alcohol.

Finance Act 1946
The 1946 Act established the National Land Fund and much of National Savings and Investments.

Finance Act 1948
The 1948 Act established the "Special Contribution", which was a one-off wealth tax.

Finance Act 1963
The 1963 Act abolished Schedule A of income tax, which was a tax on the imputed rent of owner-occupiers.

Finance Act 1965

The 1965 Act introduced corporation tax and capital gains tax.

Finance Act 1972
The 1972 Act introduced value added tax.

Finance Act 1977
The Finance Act 1977 abolished the last remaining tithes payable to the Church of England or Church in Wales.

Finance Act 2000

The Finance Act 2000 increased the Climate Change Levy.

Finance Act 2010

This Act shortly before the 2010 United Kingdom general election, passed as set out by the Labour Party adjusted the rates of the main taxes, in particular introducing on income tax the 50% 'additional rate' band.

The Act also reversed a prospective rise enacted in the Finance Act 2007 of the inheritance tax nil rate band threshold from £325,000 to £350,000 which would have applied from 6 April 2010, thus, emphasising a degree of redistribution, the tax instead continues to apply to death estates that do not benefit from any exemptions (such as spouse nil-rate-bands) and consist of a property valued at 25% above the national average.

Finance (No. 2) Act 2010

This Act of 27 July 2010 under the Coalition Government reduced the headline rate of Capital Gains Tax to 18%.

The Act increased the general rate of VAT from 17.5% to 20% (while cutting it for imported goods and materials from to 28.58% to 25% ).

Finance (No. 3) Act 2010
Enacted on 16 December 2010 this Act extended foster care relief, extended the applicability of venture capital schemes to companies with a "permanent establishment" in the UK "in financial health", modified the meaning of "distribution" in the Corporation Tax Acts, addressed the income tax treatment of seafarer's income, adjusted treatment of REITs:, modified rules as to EEA/UK consortium claims for group relief, introduced first-year allowances for zero-emission goods vehicles, adjusted for VAT purposes treatment of non-business use of business assets, amended penalties for failure to make payments on time and returns on time, proceduralised recovery of overpaid stamp duty and petroleum revenue tax, modified compliance checks as to excise duties, and clarified the tax treatment of asbestos compensation settlements in relation to the three main taxes.

Finance Act 2020
The Finance Act 2020 (2020 chapter 14) was enacted on 22 July 2020. Part 2 provides for the introduction of a Digital Services Tax.

Full title of the act including preamble and enacting formula

See also

Economic history of the United Kingdom
History of the English fiscal system
List of short titles

Notes and references
Notes 

References

Finance in the United Kingdom
Law of the United Kingdom